Mein Real (stylized mein real, real until 2022 and real,- until 2017) is a chain of hypermarkets in Germany, until 2020 owned by Metro AG. It was formed in 1992, from the merger of chains divi, Basar, Continent, Esbella and real-kauf. Until 2014 it was also active internationally, in Poland, Romania, Russia, Ukraine, and Turkey; most of these operations were bought by French retail company Auchan Group. In 2018, Metro decided to divest the Real chain and in 2021, the Real brand began to cease trading for hypermarkets as several markets were taken over by either Edeka, Kaufland, Globus, Rewe or V-Markt and got rebranded with the brand of the respective new owner. The process of selling is expected to be finished by mid of 2022 with the remaining of 60 stores under the brand name of real. Real's former website (real.de) was replaced by kaufland.de in 2021. The website for the store can be found at meinreal.de.

History
In 2006, Metro acquired Walmart's 85 stores in Germany and 26 Géant hypermarkets in Poland from the French retail group Groupe Casino.

In November 2018, Metro sold its 91 Real hypermarkets in Poland, Romania, Russia and Ukraine to Auchan for €1.1 billion. In 2014, it sold its 12 Real hypermarkets in Turkey.

In September 2018, Metro AG announced the split from Real and sale of all hypermarkets, and in February 2020, Real was sold to SCP.

In April 2021, after the new owner SCP had decided to liquidate Real and sell all outlets, the Real brand starts to began to ceased being used as a brand for hypermarkets. 270 outlets were or will sell to other supermarket chaines and got rebranded with the brand of the respective new owner, while more than 40 markets were or will be closed. The previous owner's planned goal was to complete a liquidation of Real by the end of June 2022. Locations without subsequent use should be closed. In January 2022, however, it was announced that the remaining 60 Real stores that are not being sold will not be closed, but will continue to operate as real in the future. As planned, the previous owner is withdrawing from the plan to break up real on June 30, 2022, and is selling the remaining locations to a restructuring company headed by the Frankfurt lawyer Sven Tischendorf. Restructuring is planned to ensure long-term continuation under the real brand. The Real headquarters in Düsseldorf will be dissolved as planned, and a successor company under the name real Service und Verwaltungs GmbH in Frankfurt am Main will take over some of the tasks. Purchasing and logistics are taken over by an external provider. On April 13, 2022, the Federal Cartel Office approved a purchasing cooperation between Rewe and Real.

With the change of ownership of real, the brand identity also changed. The real brand was given up on July 1, 2022, and the locations were rebranded as mein real (my real), and the long-standing claim Einmal hin. Alles drin., which has been part of the company since 2008, was replaced with alles was ich mag!.

Logos

Products
As well as food, Real also offers a wide assortment of household goods, electrical appliances, books, media, textiles and footwear (sports and regular footwear were concessions owned by Hamm Market Solutions GmbH & Co KG, based in Osnabruck, Germany), sports goods, and stationery. In addition to branded products, several store brands were offered including discount label TiP (Toll im Preis - Great Price), mid-price real Quality, premium brand realSelection, real Bio organic products and Watson consumer electronics.

Assets

Current
real Quality
realSelection
real Bio
Watson
meinreal.de

Former
real.digital - renamed to Kaufland E-Commerce
real2business - renamed to marketplaceworld
TiP - replaced by Jeden Tag
real.de - redirects to kaufland.de
Payback real club cards
real Future Store - brand discontinued and then converted to an ordinary real store in 2013
real Poland - converted to Auchan
real Russia - converted to Auchan (Ашан)
real Ukraine
real Romania - converted to Auchan and then renamed to remarkt
real Turkey

See also
 Metro AG

References

External links

Retail companies established in 1992
Hypermarkets
Supermarkets of Germany
Companies based in North Rhine-Westphalia
Metro Group
German companies established in 1992